is a Japanese talent show from Nippon Television that ran from 1971 to 1983. On October 24, 1982, the series was retitled  to reflect its switch from monaural to stereo broadcasting.

The show was created by songwriter Yū Aku, who also served as one of the judges.

In 2021, Nippon TV reused the title for the music show Nogizaka Star Tanjō!, hosted by comedy duo Pekopa and starring members of girl group Nogizaka46, which ran for two seasons. Unlike the original, the show was not a competition and only open to Nogizaka46 members, especially those of the fourth generation. It was followed by Shin Nogizaka Star Tanjō! in 2022, hosted by comedy duo Ozwald and featuring the Nogizaka46 fifth generation members.

Staff

Hosts 
 Kinichi Hagimoto (October 3, 1971 to April 6, 1980)
 Hayato Tani and Tamori (April 30, 1980 to April 5, 1981)
 Kyu Sakamoto and Mako Ishino (April 12, 1981 to January 3, 1982)
 Yasushi Yokoyama and Kiyoshi Nishikawa (January 10, 1982 to September 25, 1983)

Judges 
Hagimoto, Tani/Tamori, Sakamoto/Ishino eras
 Toshi Matsuda
 Yū Aku
 Taiji Nakamura
 Shunichi Tokura
 Takashi Miki
 Koichi Morita

Nishikawa era
 Asei Kobayashi
 James Miki
 Kyōkei Ōmoto
 Katsuhisa Hattori
 Nobuhiko Obayashi
 Shinpei Asai
 Rieko Zanma
 Hiroshi Kamayatsu

YasuKiyo era
 Michiya Mihashi
 Tetsuya Gen

Other staff 
 Tatsuya Takahashi and Tokyo Union (band performance)
 Akio Okamoto and Gay Stars (band performance)
 Ryōzō Yokomori (accordion)
 Hajime Doi (choreography)
 Reiko Inoue (assistant during the Hagimoto era)
  (Horn Yuki, Kūko Shimizu, Yuki Kitahara, and Amami Koyama) (assistants in the beginning of the Hagimoto era)
 Rinrin & Ranran (worked with Inoue during the Hagimoto era)
 Yūko Kitamura (assistant during the Hagimoto era)
 Yukihide Kurobe
 Seiroku Saitō
 Yūjirō Fubuki
 Kōji Nishiyama
 Nobuko Shima (assistant during the Tani/Tamori era)
 Sayaka Itō (assistant during the Sakamoto/Ishino era and the first part of the YasuKiyo era)
 Rabbit Sekine (assistant during the Sakamoto/Ishino era)
 Aiko Wakamatsu
 Toshihiko Hori
 The Birds Seven Plus 1 (selected members of Nippon Television Music Academy)
 Hidetoshi Itō (narrator during the YasuKiyo era)

Notable winners 
Masako Mori
Junko Sakurada
Momoe Yamaguchi
Hiromi Iwasaki
Pink Lady
Mako Ishino
Yoshie Kashiwabara
Kyōko Koizumi
Akina Nakamori
Yukiko Okada
Akiko Matsumoto

References

1970s Japanese television series
1980s Japanese television series
1971 Japanese television series debuts
1983 Japanese television series endings
Nippon TV original programming
Japanese reality television series